Wilhelm Herget (30 June 1910 – 27 March 1974) was a German Luftwaffe military aviator during World War II, a night fighter ace credited with 73—15 daytime and 58 nighttime—enemy aircraft shot down in over 700 combat missions. The majority of his victories were claimed over the Western Front in Defense of the Reich missions against the Royal Air Force's Bomber Command.

Born in Stuttgart, Herget grew up in the grew up in the German Empire, Weimar Republic and Nazi Germany. Following graduation from school and a vocational education in printing, he joined the military service in the Luftwaffe. Herget flew his first combat missions in the 1939 Invasion of Poland and in 1940, in the Battle of France and Britain. In May 1941, he participated in the Anglo-Iraqi War. In November 1941, Herget transferred to the night fighter force, initially serving with Nachtjagdgeschwader 1 (NJG 1—1st Night Fighter Wing). In September 1942, Herget became group commander of I. Gruppe (1st group) of Nachtjagdgeschwader 4 (NJG 4—4th Night Fighter Wing), a position he held until December 1944. Following his 63rd aerial victory, he was awarded the Knight's Cross of the Iron Cross with Oak Leaves on 11 April 1944. The Knight's Cross, and its variants were the highest awards in the military and paramilitary forces of Nazi Germany during World War II. Herget flew his last combat missions with Jagdverband 44 (JV 44—44th Fighter Detachment), a Messerschmitt Me 262 jet fighter unit, in 1945. After the war, he worked in publishing. Herget died on 27 March 1974 in Stuttgart.

Early life and career
Herget was born on 30 June 1910 in Stuttgart in the Kingdom of Württemberg of the German Empire, the son of a printer. After graduation from school, he learned the trade of printing and completed his Meister (master craftsman) training. Herget also served in the Sturmabteilung (SA) as Rottenführer (section leader). In parallel, he served in the military reserve force with an Aufklärungsgruppe (aerial reconnaissance group). In August 1939, Herget was posted to 6. Staffel (6th squadron) of Zerstörergeschwader 76 (ZG 76—76th Destroyer Wing) flying a Messerschmitt Bf 110 heavy fighter.

World War II
On Friday 1 September 1939, German forces invaded Poland starting World War II in Europe. Herget flew his first combat mission with ZG 76 during the invasion and was promoted to Leutnant der Reserve (second lieutenant of the reserves) on 25 October 1939. In May 1940, he fought in the Battle of France and later that year in the Battle of Britain. Herget, due to his short built, had to fly a customized Bf 110 with wooden blocks attached to the rudder pedals in order to reach them. He claimed three Supermarine Spitfire fighters shot down in May 1940 and a Curtiss P-36 Hawk fighter in June and was awarded the Iron Cross 2nd Class. On 30 August 1940, Herget claimed a Hawker Hurricane and a Spitfire on the next day. On 1 September, he claimed three further Spitfires and another on 2 September. In May 1941, Herget was transferred to Sonderkommando Junck, also referred to as Fliegerführer Irak , a Luftwaffe task force under the command of Oberst (Colonel) Werner Junck which participated in the Anglo-Iraqi War.

Night fighter career
Herget was promoted to Oberleutnant der Reserve (first lieutenant of the reserves) on 1 November 1941 and transferred to the night fighter force. There he was posted to 7. Staffel (7th squadron) of Nachtjagdgeschwader 3 (NJG 3—3rd Night Fighter Wing). On 15 January 1942, 7./NJG 3 was redesignated and became the 4. Staffel (4th squadron) of Nachtjagdgeschwader 1 (NJG 1—1st Night Fighter Wing). Herget was awarded the German Cross in Gold on 7 February 1942. Herget claimed his first nocturnal victory on the night of 5/6 April 1942.

On 1 May 1942, Herget was appointed Staffelkapitän (squadron leader) of 9. Staffel (9th squadron) of Nachtjagdgeschwader 4 (NJG 4—4th Night Fighter Wing) and promoted to Hauptmann der Reserve (captain of the reserves) on 1 October 1942. In October 1942, he became Gruppenkommandeur (group commander) of I. Gruppe NJG 4 and served in this position until December 1944. Herget received the Knight's Cross of the Iron Cross on 20 June 1943 for 31 aerial victories and the destruction of five ground targets. The presentation was made by General der Flieger (lieutenant general) Josef Kammhuber.

Herget was promoted to Major der Reserve (major of the reserves) on 1 October 1943. On the night of 20/21 December 1943, Herget was credited with the destruction of five Halifax and three Lancaster bombers within 45 minutes, making him an "ace-in-a-day". Following his 63rd aerial victory, Herget was awarded the Knight's Cross of the Iron Cross with Oak Leaves on 11 April 1944, the 451st soldier to receive this distinction. The presentation was made by Adolf Hitler at the Berghof, Hitler's residence in the Obersalzberg of the Bavarian Alps, on 5 May 1944. Also present at the ceremony were Anton Hafner, Otto Kittel, Günther Schack, Emil Lang, Alfred Grislawski, Erich Rudorffer, Martin Möbus, Hans-Karl Stepp, Rudolf Schoenert, Günther Radusch, Otto Pollmann and Fritz Breithaupt, who all received the Oak Leaves on this date.

On 15 June 1944 he was shot down by British ace Branse Burbridge. Herget and his crew bailed out and the Junkers Ju 88 G-1 (Werknummer—factory number 710833) crashed south-west of Nivelles. The crash site was initially excavated in the summer of 2008. According to Boiten and Obermaier, Herget claimed his last aerial victory as a night fighter, a de Havilland Mosquito fighter-bomber, on the night 14/15 June 1944. This claim is not documented by Foreman, Mathews and Parry, authors of Luftwaffe Night Fighter Claims 1939 – 1945.

Messerschmitt Me 262 and Jagdverband 44

In January 1945, Herget underwent conversion training and learned to fly the then new Messerschmitt Me 262 jet fighter. He then served with Sonderkommission Kleinrath, a specialized task force named after Generalleutnant (Lieutenant General) Kurt Kleinrath. This task force of the Reichsluftfahrtministerium (RLM—Ministry of Aviation) main objective was to optimize test-flying and delivery schedules of newly manufactured aircraft. In this function, Herget was involved in improving production of the Me 262 and was subsequently exposed to the slave labor system employed by the various Messerschmitt factories and subcontractors. Herget pointed out that aircraft manufacturing based on slave labor was counterproductive. News of his analysis reached Reichsmarschall (Marshal of the Reich) Hermann Göring who forbade him to visit another factory.

On 5 April 1945, Herget began testing a prototype variant of the Me 262 at Lechfeld, the Messerschmitt test airfield. The Me 262A-1a/U4 which Herget tested was equipped with an adapted  MK 214 long barreled cannon. It was believed that this weapon could bring down enemy bombers from outside their defensive firing range. The weapon system suffered from technical problems and was prone to jamming. On 16 April, Herget flew the Me 262A-1a/U4 in an unsuccessful combat mission against a United States Army Air Forces (USAAF) bomber formation. The weapon failed and no shot was fired. The Me 262 was then flown to Munich-Riem by Herget where it was placed under the control of Adolf Galland's Jagdverband 44 (JV 44—44th Fighter Detachment).

Herget's last missions of World War II were flown with JV 44. On 27 April, Herget, accompanied by Oberstleutnant (Lieutenant Colonel) Heinrich Bär and Unteroffizier Franz Köster, engaged USSAF fighters near the Munich-Riem airfield and claimed his only aerial victory flying the Me 262, a Republic P-47 Thunderbolt, and last of the war. During the final days of the World War II in Europe, Galland who had been injured in combat on 26 April, attempted to surrender JV 44 to American forces from his hospital bed. On 1 May 1945, Galland instructed Herget to fly to Oberschleißheim, which had already fallen into US hands, and negotiate the terms of surrender. At dawn, Herget and Hauptmann Hugo Kessler, Galland's aide, flew to Oberschleißheim in a Fieseler Fi 156 "Storch". The Americans then drove the two Germans to the command post of the US 45th Infantry Division in the vicinity of Feldmoching. There they met with General Pearson Menoher, Chief-of-Staff of the XV Corps, General Jesse D. Auton, commander of the 65th Fighter Wing, and Colonel Dorr E. Newton, commander of XII Tactical Air Command. Herget handed over a letter from Galland which advocated the idea of surrendering a fully operational jet fighter unit to the Americans.

Later life
Herget died on 27 March 1974 in Stuttgart. According to Mathews and Foreman, authors of Luftwaffe Aces — Biographies and Victory Claims, he had committed suicide following a failed business undertaking.

Summary of career

Aerial victory claims
Herget was credited with 73—15 daytime and 58 nighttime—aerial victories, claimed in over 700 combat missions. His 15 daytime claims includes one aerial victory flying the Me 262 jet fighter. Victory claims were logged to a map-reference (PQ = Planquadrat), for example "PQ 2417". These sectors were then subdivided into 36 smaller units to give a location area 3 × 4 km in size.

Awards
 Front Flying Clasp of the Luftwaffe for night fighter pilots in Gold with pennant
 German Cross in Gold on 7 February 1942 as Oberleutnant in the III./NJG 3
 Iron Cross (1939) 2nd and 1st class
 Knight's Cross of the Iron Cross with Oak Leaves
 Knight's Cross on 20 June 1943 as Hauptmann and Gruppenkommandeur of I./NJG 4
 451st Oak Leaves on 11 April 1944 as Major and Gruppenkommandeur of I./NJG 4

Notes

References

Citations

Bibliography

 
 
 
 
 
 
 
 
 
 
 
 
 
 
 
 
 
 
 
 
 
 
 
 
 
 
 
 
 
 
 
 
 
 
 
 
 
 
 
 
 
 

1910 births
1974 deaths
Military personnel from Stuttgart
Luftwaffe pilots
German World War II flying aces
Recipients of the Gold German Cross
Recipients of the Knight's Cross of the Iron Cross with Oak Leaves
German prisoners of war in World War II held by the United States
People from the Kingdom of Württemberg
Suicides in Germany
1974 suicides